The 2004 end of year tests (also known as the 2004 Autumn Internationals) international rugby union matches that takes place during November/December period between touring teams from the southern hemisphere. These consist of Australia, Argentina, New Zealand and South Africa, and one or more teams from the Six Nations Championship: England, France, Ireland, Italy, Scotland and Wales. South Pacific teams also toured the northern hemisphere, as well as Tier 2 European sides.

Several trophies were contested in this year's series, the main one being the Cook Cup between England and Australia. Australia won the Cook Cup match 21–19 and so won the cup for the first time since 1999.

South Africa attempted a grand slam tour but lost to England and Ireland.

Overview

Fixtures

Week 1

Notes:
 This match was the first of a two-test series between Scotland and Australia.

Week 2

Week 3

Notes:
 This was the second match in a two-test series. Australia won the series 2–0.

Week 4

Week 5

See also
 End of year rugby union tests
 Mid-year rugby union tests
 2004 Argentina rugby union tour
 2004 Wallabies Spring tour
 2004 Canada rugby union tour of Europe
 2004 Japan rugby union tour of Europe
 2004 New Zealand rugby union tour of Europe
 2004 South Africa end of year rugby union tour
 2004 South Africa end of year rugby union tour
 2004 United States rugby union tour

References

2004
2004–05 in European rugby union
2004 in Oceanian rugby union
2004 in North American rugby union
2004 in South American rugby union
2004 in South African rugby union
2004–05 in Japanese rugby union